In video games, rushing or rushdown is a battle tactic similar to the blitzkrieg or the human wave attack tactics in real-world ground warfare, in which speed and surprise are used to overwhelm an enemy's ability to wage war, usually before the enemy is able to achieve an effective buildup of sizable defensive and/or expansionist capabilities.

It is also known as a zerg or zerg rush, a term which originated in the video game StarCraft to describe a common strategy for players of the Zerg race.

Strategy games and tactical games
In the real-time strategy game StarCraft, a Zerg rush is a strategy where a player using the Zerg race tries to overwhelm the opponent through large numbers of smaller units before the enemy is fully prepared for battle.

In strategy games, to perform a rush, the attacking player focuses on quickly building a large number of weak units (or some very rare and potent early game units) early on in the game with the hopes of swarming the opponents before they can defend themselves; this is to catch them off-guard and often to cripple the opponent's economy structures. In the majority of cases, these units are fast and cheap to enable larger numbers and opportunistic attack strategies, but they may sometimes be chosen to exploit a particular weakness of the enemy. The player who rushes may sacrifice options such as long-term resource gathering, defense, or immediate research up the tech tree to opt instead for a quick strike, usually putting the rushing player at a severe disadvantage should the rush be unsuccessful.

A successful rush usually attempts to disrupt the resource gathering of the defending player or annihilate that player entirely. The rush is a risky tactic. If the rush is successful, then the player may have won the game or significantly set his or her opponent back; if the rush fails, then the rushing player may have lost valuable time and resources that would have been better spent on research, building defenses, and building more powerful units. A rush can also be considered a mass attack with primarily only one type of unit used, and depends on overwhelming numbers and force to succeed. The rush is often a suicidal attack (for the units involved); rushing units are often expected to die, but to nevertheless benefit the player initiating the rush by disrupting the opponent's operations. Rushes may also be used to force an opponent between  poor decisions. In video-games which track ammunition and other resources, such as in the Men of War and Wargame series, a rush forces an opponent to expend a limited resource (ammunition) to counter the attack, to retreat to evade the attack, or to not return the attack. The consequences of such means that an opponent will have less resources to fight another, well-structured assault, will have lost ground, or will have lost units, respectively.

An alpha strike denotes an all-out attack launched in hopes of achieving a decisive advantage, determining the inevitable defeat of the target before they can respond effectively. This is usually considered a risky manoeuvre, as if the attacker fails to gain a decisive advantage, it can leave the attacker's units overextended and vulnerable to counter-attack.

See also

 List of military strategies
 List of military tactics
 Banzai charge
 Blitzkrieg
 Blitz (American football)
 Camping (gaming)
 Mob (computer gaming)
 Shock tactics
 Swarming (military)
 Turtling (gameplay)
 Human wave attack
 Leeroy Jenkins

References

Esports techniques
Video game terminology